Mill Island, also known as the Seymour Family House, is a historic home located near Moorefield, Hardy County, West Virginia. The original brick cottage was built in 1798. In 1840, a two-story, brick Greek Revival style mansion was appended. The -story building features a one bay, temple style entrance porch and a "widow's walk" on the roof peak.  The porch columns are in the Corinthian order. The interior features a great ballroom, reception hall, parlors, and a huge dining room.  During the American Civil War, it was used as a hospital by the McNeill's Rangers.

It was listed on the National Register of Historic Places in 1973.

References

American Civil War hospitals
Greek Revival houses in West Virginia
Hardy County, West Virginia in the American Civil War
Houses completed in 1798
Houses in Hardy County, West Virginia
Houses on the National Register of Historic Places in West Virginia
National Register of Historic Places in Hardy County, West Virginia
1798 establishments in Virginia
American Civil War sites in West Virginia